Lonesome Luke, Lawyer is a 1917 American short comedy film featuring Harold Lloyd.

Cast
 Harold Lloyd as Lonesome Luke
 Bebe Daniels
 Snub Pollard
 Bud Jamison
 Charles Stevenson (as Charles E. Stevenson)
 W.L. Adams
 Estelle Harrison
 Sidney De Gray
 Gus Leonard
 Lottie Case
 Sammy Brooks
 Merta Sterling (as Myrtle Sterling)
 Dorothea Wolbert (as Dorothy Wolbert)
 Harry L. Rattenberry
 C.G. King
 Norman Napier

See also
 Harold Lloyd filmography

References

External links

1917 films
1917 short films
American silent short films
1917 comedy films
American black-and-white films
Films directed by Hal Roach
Silent American comedy films
Lonesome Luke films
American comedy short films
1910s American films